Goodenia goodeniacea is a species of flowering plant in the family Goodeniaceae and is endemic to northern, inland Australia. It a prostrate herb with toothed, elliptic to egg-shaped leaves at the base of the plant, and thyrses of yellow flowers with purplish lines.

Description
The leaves on the stem are similar but smaller.

Taxonomy and naming
This species was first formally described in 1859 by Ferdinand von Mueller who gave it the name Scaevola goodeniacea in Fragmenta Phytographiae Australiae. In 1990 Roger Charles Carolin changed the name to Goodenia goodeniacea in the journal Telopea.

Distribution and habitat
This goodenia grows on plains and sand dunes in scattered populations between Tennant Creek and Sturt Creek in the Northern Territory, and in Queensland.

Conservation status
Goodenia goodeniacea is classified as of "least concern" under the Queensland Government Nature Conservation Act 1992 and the Northern Territory Government Territory Parks and Wildlife Conservation Act 1976.

References

goodeniacea
Flora of the Northern Territory
Flora of Queensland
Plants described in 1990
Taxa named by Roger Charles Carolin
Endemic flora of Australia